Alfred A. Poulin, Jr. or A. Poulin (1938–1996) was an American poet, translator, and editor noted for his translation of Rainer Maria Rilke's Duino Elegies and the Sonnets to Orpheus. Poulin studied at St. Francis College in Maine, Loyola University in Chicago, Illinois, and at the University of Iowa Writers' Workshop.  He later taught as a professor at the State University of New York at Brockport. His translation work focused on translating poetry from French and German into English.

Works

Poetry
 1978: The Nameless Garden 
 1987: Momentary Order
 1991: Cave Dwellers: Poems
 2001: Selected Poems (posthumous)

Translations
 1994: Hébert, Anne. Day Has No Equal But Night (Rochester, NY: BOA Editions).   
 1988: Hébert, Anne. Selected Poems. Translated by A. Poulin Jr.. (Toronto: Stoddart, 1988). 
 1975: Rilke, Rainer Maria. Duino Elegies and The Sonnets To Orpheus translated by Alfred Poulin, Jr. (Boston: Houghton Mifflin Company).

References

External links 

 A. Poulin Papers and BOA Editions Records. Yale Collection of American Literature, Beinecke Rare Book and Manuscript Library.

1938 births
1996 deaths
20th-century American poets
20th-century American translators
American male poets
20th-century American male writers